Los Melódicos is a Latin dance band from Venezuela which plays a mix of tropical rhythms. The orchestra was assembled by Billo Frómeta in Caracas in July 1958. They made their debut through a local radio station on July 15, 1960. Frómeta sold the orchestra to Renato Capriles, who was acting as an owner as Billo was suspended by the Venezuelans musicians union. Renato took over in 1960 and Los Melódicos has been directed by him since then. The orchestra was voted by a Caracas journalist association as the best Venezuelan orchestra that year. 
 
Since its establishment, Los Melódicos has released more than 100 original albums and has toured extensively in Venezuela, Colombia, and in the top Hispanic circles of New York, Los Angeles, Chicago and Miami, being awarded in Venezuela 139 times, as well in Colombia (9) and United States (5). Leads singers in their history include Emilita Dago, Manolo Monterrey, Víctor Piñero, Rafa Galindo, Chico Salas, Perucho Navarro, Roberto Antonio, Roxana García, Diveana, Liz, Angie, and Veronica Rey.

Los Melódicos is still touring under Iliana Capriles' direction, with the band mainly playing songs at parties which were previously recorded by Oscar Garcia Urrego. The Orchestra hasn't recorded any new material in more than 11 years.

References

External links

Latin American music
Venezuelan musical groups
Musical groups established in 1958
1958 establishments in Venezuela